Rudolf Urban (soccer player) (born 1 March 1980) is a Slovak footballer who currently plays for DOXXbet liga club FC Lokomotíva Košice.

External links
 
 

Slovak footballers
Slovakia international footballers
FK Inter Bratislava players
Győri ETO FC players
MFK Ružomberok players
FC VSS Košice players
FC Vysočina Jihlava players
FK Baník Most players
Sandecja Nowy Sącz players
Piast Gliwice players
Podbeskidzie Bielsko-Biała players
FC Lokomotíva Košice players
1980 births
Living people
Sportspeople from Košice
Slovak expatriate footballers
Expatriate footballers in Poland
Slovak expatriate sportspeople in Poland
Association football midfielders